is a town located in Gunma Prefecture, Japan. , the town had an estimated population of 15,571 in 6737 households, and a population density of 35 persons per km².

Geography
Located in the northwestern portion of Gunma Prefecture, Nakanojō is surrounded by high peaks of over 1000 m in height, with the Agatsuma River passing through the center of town from west to east. The town has a mean elevation of 400 meters above sea level. The town's area is 83% mountains and forests (197 km2).

 Rivers: Agatsuma River, Shima River
 Lakes: Shimagawa Dam

Surrounding municipalities
Gunma Prefecture
 Kusatsu
 Naganohara
 Higashiagatsuma
 Shibukawa
Minakami
Nagano Prefecture
 Sakae
 Yamanouchi
 Takayama
Niigata Prefecture
 Yuzawa

Climate
Nakanojō has a humid subtropical climate (Köppen Cfa) characterized by hot summers and cold winters with heavy snowfall.  The average annual temperature in Nakanojō is 8.5 °C. The average annual rainfall is 1489 mm with September as the wettest month. The temperatures are highest on average in August, at around 24.4 °C, and lowest in January, at around 0.2 °C.

Demographics
Per Japanese census data, the population of Nakanojō has declined steadily over the past 70 years.

Neighborhoods within Nakanojō
 

Akasaka (赤坂)
Aoyama (青山)
Arigawa (蟻川)
Daidou (大道)
Gotanda (五反田)
Ichishiro (市城)
Ise-machi (伊勢町)
Iwamoto (岩本)
Nakuta (名久田)

Orida (折田)
Ōtsuka (大塚)
Upper Sawatari (上沢渡)
Lower Sawatari (下沢渡)
Shima (四万)
Taira (平)
Tochikubo (栃窪)
West Nakanojo (西中之条)
Yamada (山田)

(former Kuni village)
Akaiwa (赤岩）
Hikage (日影)
Iriyama (入山)
Kosame (小雨）
Ōshi (太子)

History
During the Edo period, the area around Nakanojō was part of the hatamoto-administered territory within Kōzuke Province.

With the creation of the modern municipalities system after the Meiji Restoration on April 1, 1889, the town of Nakanojō was created within Agatsuma District of Gunma Prefecture. The villages of Isama, Sawada and Nakuta merged into Nakanojō on April 15, 1955.

On March 28, 2010, the village of Kuni, also from Agatsuma District, merged into Nakanojō.

Government
Nakanojō has a mayor-council form of government with a directly elected mayor and a unicameral town council of 15 members. Nakanojō, collectively with the other municipalities in Agatsuma District, contributes two members to the Gunma Prefectural Assembly. In terms of national politics, the town is part of Gunma 5th district of the lower house of the Diet of Japan.

Economy
The economy of Nakanojō is heavily dependent on seasonal tourism primarily in connection with its onsen hot spring resorts.

Education
Nakanojō has two public elementary schools and two public middle schools operated by the town government, and one public high schools operated by the Gunma Prefectural Board of Education. The city also has one private middle school and one private high school. Gunma Prefecture also operates one special education school for the handicapped.

Transportation

Railway
 JR East – Agatsuma Line
 -

Highway

Local attractions
The main draw of tourists to Nakanojō are the onsen (natural hot spring) resorts. There are two major hot spring resort areas within the town. The larger and more famous one is Shima Onsen, located in the mountains to the north of town. The name means "forty thousand", and represents the 40,000 ailments the water is supposed to cure. The other resort is called Sawatari Hot Springs.

Festivals and events
Nakanojō has three main festivals during the year. In winter, there is the Tori-oi Matsuri. This involves pounding on large drum all around town to scare birds (for good crops) or demons (for good luck) away for the new year. In summer, there is the Nakanojō Matsuri in August and the Ise-machi Matsuri in September. The Ise-machi Matsuri features the Yagibushi Folk Dance.

Melody road
When an automobile drives at 40 km/h over a special melody road section of Japan National Route 353 passing through Nakanojō, the vibrations will sound the tune "Always With Me" (Japanese title: いつも何度でも, Itsumo nando demo) from the feature animation Spirited Away.

Notable people from Nakanojō
Keizo Obuchi, former Prime Minister of Japan
Yūko Obuchi, politician

References

External links

Official Website 

Towns in Gunma Prefecture
Spa towns in Japan
Nakanojō, Gunma